Mirakeh-ye Qaleh Qazi (also Romanized as Mīrakeh-ye Qal‘eh Qāẕī; also known as Mīrageh-ye Qal‘eh Qāẕī and Mīrakeh) is a village in Haft Ashiyan Rural District, Kuzaran District, Kermanshah County, Kermanshah Province, Iran. At the 2006 census, its population was 170, in 39 families.

References 

Populated places in Kermanshah County